Surendranath College is an undergraduate college affiliated to the University of Calcutta, in Kolkata, India. It was founded in 1884 by the nationalist leader and scholar Surendranath Banerjee.

The Women's section of the college was founded in 1931 by Mira Datta Gupta, its first Principal.

For much of its history it was known as Ripon College, named for the British Viceroy Lord Ripon, but in 1948–1949, it was renamed for its founder. Swami Vivekananda delivered his first address in Calcutta from the rostrum of this college on  his return from Chicago after his famous deliverance at the Parliament of the World's Religions.

It's a NAAC B+ grade accredited college (2017).

Eminent faculty

Jadunath Sarkar, eminent Indian historian
Sir Surendranath Banerjea - Founder of Indian National Association, precursor to Indian National Congress
Buddhadeb Bosu - Poet and novelist
Bishnu Dey, Poet, Jnanpith Award winner
Mira Datta Gupta - Eminent Social Activist and Politician
Hiren Mukherjee - Ex Faculty - Department of History/ Ex Parliamentarian
Phani Bhusan Chakravartti - First Indian chief Justice of the Calcutta High Court
Ramendra Sundar Tribedi - a renowned Bengali author, later was also Principal of College

Notable alumni

Dhirendranath Datta, Bangladeshi language movement leader
Maulvi Tamizuddin Khan, Former Speaker of Pakistan's Constituent Assembly
Mohammad Mohammadullah, Former President of Bangladesh
Anil Kumar Gain, renowned mathematician from the University of Cambridge, Fellow of the Royal Society
Bibhutibhushan Bandopadhyay - novelist
Nirad C. Chaudhuri - author
Sunil Gangopadhyay - novelist
Mani Shankar Mukherjee - novelist
Farrukh Ahmed - poet
Mohitlal Majumdar - literary critic
Bishnu Prasad Rabha - author, poet, music director
Chintamoni Kar - Eminent sculptor; Principal of Government College of Art & Craft, Kolkata
Sailen Manna - Captain, Indian soccer team (1952 Olympic Games).
Sachindra Prasad Bose - Political activist
Padma Nidhi Dhar, Politician
Shaktipada Rajguru, Bengali author
 Maulvi Muhib-us-Samad Chowdhury, religious scholar and mystic of Sylhet

Social initiative
During the Coronavirus Pandemic in India, With the demand for hand sanitizers raised in the wake of the Coronavirus scare, Surendranath College made a low-cost sanitiser meeting WHO guidelines. Apart from the chemical ingredients available at the lab, other contents such as Alcohol and Hydrogen Peroxide were procured from market, and the concoction was prepared meeting WHO specifications. The sanitiser is named Sparsho (touch) and the bottles are distributed for free among the locals

See also 
Surendranath Law College
Surendranath Evening College
Surendranath College for Women
List of colleges affiliated to the University of Calcutta
Education in India
Education in West Bengal

References

External links

Academic institutions associated with the Bengal Renaissance
Universities and colleges in Kolkata
Educational institutions established in 1884
University of Calcutta affiliates
1884 establishments in British India